Muzafar Said is a Pakistani politician hailing from Bangai Ziarat Talash, Tehsil Timergara, District Lower Dir who serves as minister of Minister for Finance and Statistics in the Khyber Pakhtunkhwa Assembly. He is also serving as the member of Public Accounts Committee.

External links

References

Living people
Pashtun people
Khyber Pakhtunkhwa MPAs 2013–2018
People from Lower Dir District
Jamaat-e-Islami Pakistan politicians
Year of birth missing (living people)